The Country Cat is a Southern restaurant in Portland, Oregon. The original restaurant operated in southeast Portland from 2007 to 2019, and a second location has operated at the Portland International Airport since 2015.

History
Adam and Jackie Sappington opened the original restaurant in southeast Portland's Montavilla neighborhood in 2007, followed by a second at the Portland International Airport in 2015. The Montavilla restaurant closed in 2019, but the airport location continued to operate.

In 2013, the original location was featured on an episode of Diners, Drive-Ins and Dives, hosted by Guy Fieri.

See also
 List of Southern restaurants

References

External links

 
 The Country Cat at the Food Network
 Country Cat at Frommer's
 The Country Cat at Lonely Planet
 The Country Cat Dinner House and Bar at Zagat
 The Country Cat Dinnerhouse and Bar at Zomato

2007 establishments in Oregon
Southern restaurants
Montavilla, Portland, Oregon
Northeast Portland, Oregon
Portland International Airport
Restaurants established in 2007